The United Nations Mission in the Central African Republic and Chad (MINURCAT) was a United Nations peacekeeping mission established by the United Nations Security Council on September 25, 2007 to provide a multidimensional presence of up to 350 police and military personnel to eastern Chad and north-eastern Central African Republic

The mission comes as a response to the dire situation of an estimated 230,000 refugees from Darfur who continue to flee into bordering eastern Chad and north-eastern Central African Republic (CAR). Armed Sudanese rebel groups have continuously carried out attacks across the Sudanese border, endangering local residents and Darfurian refugees alike.

This followed on from a resolution in July 2007 sending UNAMID into the region and a resolution in August 2006 sending UNMIS there, the Secretary-General drafted a report outlining the shape of the mission he thought should be sent there, as well as received assurance from the European Union of its contribution of troops.

Although the EUFOR Tchad/RCA was originally scheduled to deploy in November 2007, it was delayed until February by a lack of equipment. It reached its Initial Operational Capability on 15 March 2008 and was replaced by UN forces under the same MINURCAT mandate on 15 March 2009. The latest resolution to concern the MINURCAT mandate, Security Council Resolution 1913, extended the stationing of the mission until 15 May 2010 allowing further discussions with the Chadian government which asked for the mandate not be renewed. A further extension was done until the end of 2010.

MINURCAT's mandate officially ended on December 31, 2010.

Strength

Military personnel
As of 2010, there were 5,200 military personnel and 27 military liaison officers from Algeria, Bangladesh, Benin, Burkina Faso, Democratic Republic of the Congo, Denmark, Egypt, Ethiopia, Ghana, Ireland, Kenya, Mali, Mongolia, Namibia, Nepal, Nigeria, Norway, Pakistan, Poland, Russia, Rwanda, Senegal, Serbia, Sri Lanka, Togo, Tunisia and United States.

Police personnel
As of 2010, there were 300 police officers from Benin, Burkina Faso, Cameroon, Côte d'Ivoire, Egypt, Finland, France, Guinea, Jordan, Madagascar, Mali, Niger, Oman,  Rwanda, Senegal, Turkey and Yemen.

European Union mission
The EU forces mission EUFOR Tchad/RCA operated under the auspices and in the framework of MINURCAT in Chad and the Central African Republic as authorized in late 2007. The deployment of up to 3,700 troops began in February 2008. Contributors included (with number of troops committed):
  Albania – 63 troops from Commando Regiment 
  France – half of the full contingent
  Ireland – 411 troops
  Poland – 350 troops
  Sweden – 200 troops
  Austria – 160 troops
  Romania – 120 troops
  Belgium – 100 troops
  Spain – 80 troops
  Finland – 40 troops
  Netherlands – 60 Marines

According to the Brussels-based news agency “Panapress”, a number of non-EU countries also expressed interest in providing logistic or personnel support to the EUFOR mission.

Their mandate included “to take all necessary measures, within its capabilities and its area of operation in eastern Chad and the north-eastern Central African Republic” to protect civilians, facilitate delivery of humanitarian aid, and ensure the safety of UN personnel. The EU operation commander, General Patrick Nash, announced on 5 November that this force will be 3,700 troops strong. The military operation was approved by the Council of the European Union on 15 October.

References

External links
2013-2014 Central African Republic Crisis Overview
HDPT - United Nations website monitoring detailed progress of EUFOR TCHAD/RCA and MINURCAT
MINURCAT website
Massachusetts Institute of Technology (MIT) Study on MINURCAT and EUFOR TCHAD/RCA
EUFOR TCHAD/RCA website
Security Council authorizes establishment of ‘Multidimensional Presence’ in Chad, Central African Republic, unanimously adopting Resolution 1778 (2007) UN News Centre

Central African Republic and Chad
1778
2007 in the Central African Republic
2007 in Chad
Central African Republic–Chad relations
Central African Republic–Sudan relations
Central African Republic and the United Nations
Chad and the United Nations